Naveena Saraswathi Sabatham is a 2013 Indian Tamil-language fantasy comedy film written and directed by K. Chandru. The film revolves around four men, played by Jai, VTV Ganesh, Sathyan and Rajkumar. Niveda Thomas was paired opposite Jai. The film was produced by Kalpathi S Aghoram and has cinematography by Anand Jeeva; songs were composed by Prem Kumar. The film went on floors on 29 November 2013. It is not a sequel of the 1966 film Saraswathi Sabatham.

Plot 

The film begins in a modern heaven where Lord Paramasivan gives orders to Narada to pick four people for his Thiruvilaiyadal. The candidates picked are Ramarajan, a Siddha doctor; Ganesh, a helpless man who is the husband of a local female don; Gopi, a future politician and son of a selfish politician; and Krishna, a budding actor. Paramasivan and Narada see all the four's routines and premises on an iMac. Ramarajan falls in love with a singer Jayshree, and wins her heart. Engaged for marriage after 26 days, the four men plan to fix a bachelor party at Bangkok. When they reach Bangkok, they enjoy it and flirt with girls at the party. However, they are too drunk, and when they wake up, they find themselves abandoned on a tropical island in Bangkok. They try many ways to escape but are unsuccessful. Six months have elapsed, and Paramasivan gives them a final chance, which is a motorboat of pirates arriving to explore the island. The four of them beg them to take them to Chennai, but they refuse to help them and flee. The quartet fights the pirates back and escapes the island in the boat, abandoning the pirates on the island. After reaching Chennai, they have a happy ending except for Gopi.

When Ramarajan goes to his house, Kamaraj is happy to see that his son is alive. But Ramarajan sees that Kamaraj has married another woman in the meantime as a second wife. On the same day, Ramarajan finds out that Aravind Gautham is going to marry his girlfriend Jayashree and rushes to the marriage hall. Just as Ramarajan enters exactly that marriage hall, Aravind Gautham goes to tie the nuptial thread around Jayashree’s neck with his hands. Before that, Ramarajan shouts and suspends the marriage. Jayashree gets up from the wedding stage and happily runs to Ramarajan. Later, Ramarajan and Jayashree go to the wedding stage to get married. Ramarajan sits on the wedding stage with Jayashree after wishing Aravind Gautham, a software engineer who was already sitting there as a groom, that he would definitely get another nice bride. Then, with the blessings of everyone present there, Ramarajan ties the nuptial thread around Jayashree's neck and she willingly accepts it too. And the story of the film ends with Paramasivan and Parvati preaching to their people. In a post-credits scene, the film mentions behind the scenes.

Cast 

 Jai as Ramarajan, a siddha doctor
 Niveda Thomas as Jayashree, a singer
 VTV Ganesh as Ganesh, a husband of a local female don
 Sathyan as Gopi, a future politician
 Rajkumar as Krishna, an actor
 Manobala as Narada
 Subbu Panchu as Paramasivan
 Devadarshini as Parvati
 Ramya Shankar as Saraswati
 Swaminathan as MLA Ekambaram
 Chitra Lakshmanan as Kovai Kamaraj
 Badava Gopi as Rajendran
 R. S. Sivaji as Jayashree's father
 Usha Elizabeth as Jayashree's mother
 Raj Kamal as Jayashree's brother
 Archana Harish as Jayashree's sister-in-law
 S. V. S. Kumar as Jayashree's grandfather
 T. R. Latha as Jayashree's grandmother
 Rekha Suresh as Mrs. Ekambaram
 Emey as Sorna Akka
 Vishal Venkat as Murugan
 Master Mathusuthanan
 Venkat Prabhu as himself
 Sam Anderson as Kumar (cameo appearance)

Production 
The film began production on 26 February 2013. Chandru shot the first scene in Villivakkam, Chennai. Though the film is set in Chennai, the director said that a minor portion will be shot abroad. In June 2013 VTV Ganesh left to Malaysia for the shoot of Saraswathi Sabatham with Jai. By July, about 80% of the film shooting had been wrapped.

The film was initially named Saraswathi Sabatham, reusing the title of the 1966 film starring Sivaji Ganesan, and fans of Ganesan stated they would not allow the usage of titles of their idol for comedy films and that they would protest in front of Jai and Sathyan's houses if the makers proceeded with the same title. A notice, demanding that the film should be renamed, was sent to film producer Kalpathi Agoram and his brothers Ganesh and Suresh, on behalf of the Nellai City Sivaji social welfare organisation by advocate Kamaraj. On 25 September 2013, it was announced that the film had been retitled as Naveena Saraswathi Sabatham.

The first look poster of the film was revealed on 14 April 2013.

Soundtrack 
The soundtrack album was composed by Prem Kumar. The lyrics were written by Vairamuthu, Madhan Karky and Gaana Bala. The music was released on 13 October 2013. The track 'Kaathirundhai Anbe' was released earlier as a single.

Critical reception 
Naveena Saraswathi Sabatham received mixed reviews from critics. Baradwaj Rangan wrote, "Very occasionally, a line or a sight gag makes you smile, like the one with the roadside idli seller with a signboard that announces "pizza" and "burger." Otherwise, it's all very exhausting". Indiaglitz said, "Motive is in place perfectly; however it has taken to long to be conveyed. Revolving around four men almost all the time, the film could have avoided a few scenes that occupied time. The 1966 flick has certainly influenced 'Naveena Saraswathi Sabatham' he arriving at its climax twist, but has got nothing in connection with it otherwise." and added, "In all, the film is a brand new concept, with a contemporary message and a revolutionary screenplay, although it ultimately ends in an old fashion. A clean entertainer by nature, 'Naveena Saraswathi Sabatham' is old wine in a not-exactly-new but quite a fancy bottle." Sify called it disappointing and wrote, "The film has no basic logic or reason and seems to have been made with the only intention of trying to tickle the funny bone of the viewers, without any content" and added "There is a scene in the second half of the film where Naradar tells Lord Siva that the story isn't progressing fast, people will be posting on Facebook and Twitter that the first half of the film is super while the second half is Mokkai! It sort of sums up NSS". The Times of India gave 2.5 stars out of 5 and pointed out the same as Sify, "There is a scene in the second half in which Naradar tells Lord Siva that the story isn't progressing and by this time, people will be posting on Facebook and Twitter that the first half of the film is super while the second half is mokkai...Sadly, it is also the most profound statement in the entire film — not only on the audiences of today but also on the films we get these days, including this one, which just turns dreary, minutes after we enter the second half".

IANS gave 2 out of 5 stars and wrote, "The humour is stale and has been used for years now. The film meanders at a snail's pace and becomes extremely tedious in the second half. He (Chandru) throws in what are supposedly a few funny incidents that hardly evoke any laughter, forget the entertainment. This is not even a film you can force yourself to watch because you have paid money. It's god's way of punishing us for all the bad we have done in our lives". Talking about the performances, Behindwoods said, "VTV Ganesh is the biggest takeaway from the movie and he moves the second half forward with his antics on the island. The portions where he speaks chaste Tamil in his hoarse voice are a riot. Jai's shrill voice has been his USP all along and he comfortably delivers what was expected." and added "Sathyan and Rajkumar as the other two friends play their roles with ease and fit in with the group. Niveda Thomas appears in exactly two scenes and two songs!"

Box office 
'NSS' opened average collected  8.3 crore in first weekend at the box office. The film collected  1.30 crore in first weekend in Chennai alone, opening at first position at the Chennai box office ahead of the other new releases.

References

External links 
 

2010s buddy films
2010s fantasy comedy films
2010s Tamil-language films
2013 comedy films
2013 directorial debut films
2013 films
Films about castaways
Films set in Chennai
Films set on uninhabited islands
Films shot in Chennai
Films shot in Malaysia
Hindu mythological films
Indian buddy films
Indian fantasy comedy films
Indian nonlinear narrative films
Indian religious comedy films